The 2009–10 FIS Snowboard World Cup was a multi race tournament over a season for snowboarding. The season started on 9 October 2009 and lasted until 17 March 2010. The World Cup was organised by the FIS who also run world cups and championships in cross-country skiing, ski jumping, Nordic combined, alpine skiing, and snowboarding. The snowboarding world cup consisted of three events, the parallel slalom, snowboard cross, and the halfpipe. The men's side of the world cup also consisted of a big air competition.

Calendar

Men

Parallel Slalom

Snowboard Cross

Halfpipe

Big Air

Women

Parallel Slalom

Snowboard Cross

Halfpipe

Standings

References
Official FIS Snowboard Site

FIS Snowboard World Cup
Fis Snowboard World Cup
Fis Snowboard World Cup